Aspergillus vitricola is a species of fungus in the genus Aspergillus. It is from the Robusti section. The species was first described in 1962 by Ohtsuki. It has been isolated from binocular lenses in Japan and house dust in Canada.

Summary
Cryoprotected cells containing viable organisms (including spores and mycelia).

References 

vitricola
Fungi described in 1962